Klaas Hendrikse (September 1, 1947, Groot-Ammers – Middelburg, June 26, 2018) was a Dutch minister of the Protestant Church in the Netherlands who declared that he "believes in a God who does not exist." He was known in the Netherlands as de atheïstische dominee (the atheist pastor).

Life and career
Hendrikse grew up in a non-religious family in the Alblasserwaard; his father was a veterinary surgeon. He went to school in Gorinchem and studied in Nyenrode (1968-1971) and Michigan State University (1971-1972). Between 1972 and 1983 he worked for Xerox. After becoming interested in religion, he studied theology at the Utrecht University between 1977 and 1983, before becoming a preacher.

He achieved national fame as "the atheist pastor" after he stated in a number of newspapers, including Trouw and Volkskrant, that he did not believe in God's literal existence but as something that "happens." Klaas Hendrikse has described God as "a word for experience, or human experience" and said that Jesus may have never existed. His comments caused outrage both within the Protestant Church in the Netherlands (PKN) and outside. Hendrikse later said that he did not consider himself to be an atheist, but tried to stay close to atheism in his choice of words and away from the "jargon of the church."

The PKN considered at first taking disciplinary action against Hendrikse, but dropped the case in 2009. The authorities stated that such a case would merely result in "a protracted discussion about the meanings of words that in the end will produce little clarity." Hendrikse has said that he would "rather remain as a louse in the fur of the PKN" than leave and form his own religious community.

Hendrikse's religious views were not considered extreme in a large part of the Netherlands. In the PKN, 42% of its members described themselves in 2007 as non-theists. Furthermore, in the PKN and several other smaller denominations of the Netherlands, one in six clergy are either agnostic or atheist.

Hendrikse died in 2018.

Trivia
Hendrikse features in the novel Artush and Zaur, by Ali Akbar, in which he performs a wedding ceremony for the homosexual protagonists.

Books
Believing in a God that does not exist: the manifesto of an atheist pastor. (2007)
God does not exist and Jesus is his son. (2011)

See also
Christian atheism
Irreligion in the Netherlands

References

1947 births
2018 deaths
Christ myth theory proponents
Dutch atheists
Protestant Church Christians from the Netherlands
Religious naturalists
People from Liesveld